Blohm is a surname. Notable people with the surname include:

Hans Blohm C.M. (born 1927), photographer and author
Hermann Blohm (1848–1930), German businessman and co-founder of German company Blohm+Voss
Linn Blohm (born 1992), Swedish handball player for IK Sävehof and the Swedish national team
Robert Blohm (born 1948), American and Canadian investment banker, economist and statistician, professor in China's Central University of Finance and Economics
Tom Blohm (1920–2000), Norwegian football player

See also
Blohm + Voss, a German shipbuilding and engineering works
Blom
Bohm (disambiguation)

de:Blohm